Mark, Markus or Marcus Eriksson may refer to:

Mark Eriksson, American experimental physicist at UW–Madison since 1999
Marcus Eriksson (ice hockey) (born 1976), Swedish ice hockey player
Markus Eriksson (curler) (born 1987), Swedish curler
Markus Eriksson (tennis) (born 1989), Swedish tennis player
Marcus Eriksson (basketball) (born 1993), Swedish basketball player

See also
Marcus Ericsson (born 1990), Swedish race car driver
Mark Erickson (disambiguation)